The Oskar Ewald Tenement is a tenement located at 30 Gdańska Street, at the intersection with Krasinski Street, in Bydgoszcz, Poland.

History
The house was built in 1895-1896 for the photographer Oskar Ewald. In the address book of the city of Bromberg, his details are "154 Danzigerstrasse".

The architect was Józef Święcicki. He was working at the same period on the following buildings:
 Hotel "Pod Orlem", at 14 Gdańska Street;
 Józef Święcicki tenement, at 63 Gdańska street;
 Tenement at 86 Gdańska street;
 Carl Bradtke Tenement, at 96 Gdańska street;
 Villa Hugo Hecht at 88/90 Gdańska street;
 Tenement at 1 Freedom Square.

Architecture
For Oskar Ewald's edifice, Józef Święcicki used characteristics of Eclecticism to adorn the facade, and especially neo-Baroque features.
Its essential three-storey neo-baroque body is topped with a prominent cornice.

The top floor of the building housed originally Oskar Ewald's photographic studio. It had the corner-shape of the curved facade, and was covered by a glass roof. The workshop occupied also the first two levels: a dedicated lift was used by customers to access the studio. In 1919, Władysława Spiżewska, the first Polish woman to become a professional photographer 
in Bydgoszcz purchased the photo atelier at the top floor and used it till 1924.

At the beginning of the 20th century, the ground floor of the building housed a flower shop run by Anna Stössel.

Gallery

See also

 Bydgoszcz
 Gdanska Street in Bydgoszcz
 Zygmunt Krasiński Street in Bydgoszcz
 Józef Święcicki

References

Bibliography
  
  

Buildings and structures on Gdańska Street, Bydgoszcz
Buildings by Józef Święcicki
Residential buildings completed in 1896